HMS Bligh  was a  active during World War II.

Originally destined for the US Navy as a turbo-electric (TE) type , HMS Bligh was provisionally given the name USS Liddle, a name that was later reassigned to another ship. However, the delivery was diverted to the Royal Navy before the launch.

Service history
HMS Bligh served exclusively with the 5th Escort Group taking part in operations in the Eastern Atlantic, the English Channel, and off Normandy.

On 7 November 1944, an accidental firing of an anti-aircraft gun while docked at Liverpool caused both death and injury on the troopship .

References
 The Captain Class Frigates in the Second World War by Donald Collingwood. published by Leo Cooper (1998), .
 The Buckley-Class Destroyer Escorts by Bruce Hampton Franklin, published by Chatham Publishing (1999), .
 German U-Boat Losses During World War II by Axel Niestle, published by United States Naval Inst (1998), .

External links
 Uboat.net page for HMS Bligh
 Uboat.net page for U-765
 Uboat.net page for U-1172
 captainclassfrigates.co.uk

Captain-class frigates
Buckley-class destroyer escorts
World War II frigates of the United Kingdom
Ships built in Hingham, Massachusetts
1943 ships
Ships transferred from the United States Navy to the Royal Navy